Tecpatlán Totonac is a Totonac language of central Mexico.

References

Totonacan languages
Endangered Totonacan languages

Languages of Mexico